Morgan Holmes is a Canadian sociologist, author, and a professor at Wilfrid Laurier University, Ontario. She is also an intersex activist and writer, and former member of Intersex Society of North America. Holmes participated in the first public demonstration by intersex people, now marked by Intersex Awareness Day.

Early life 
Holmes underwent a clitorectomy, described as a "clitoral recession", at age 7, at The Hospital for Sick Children in Toronto. This surgery was undertaken because her clitoris "could become erect", and the surgery has affected her life ever since, including repeated pelvic exams, adolescent sexual experiences, fear of intimacy, and feelings of difference and embarrassment. Holmes describes how clinician "promises of sexual normalcy are not being met" by surgical intervention.

Holmes refers to herself as "still intersexual" after medical intervention.

Career

Activism 
A member of the (now defunct) Intersex Society of North America, Holmes participated with Max Beck and others in the first North American demonstration about intersex issues, a 1996 demonstration as Hermaphrodites with Attitude outside the Annual Meeting of the American Academy of Pediatrics in Boston. The event is now commemorated internationally as Intersex Awareness Day. She participated in the second International Intersex Forum in 2012.

Academia 
Holmes is a professor of sociology at Wilfrid Laurier University, Ontario, where she describes her academic interests as sexuality and queer theory, feminist thought; qualitative health research and law related to sexuality and health. Holmes has also extended her interest in intersex issues to other forms of bodily diversity, including disability.

Works 
Holmes is widely published, including works that link intersex to queer theory and ideas of compulsory heterosexuality. In Re-membering a Queer Body''' (1994), Holmes describes how surgery on intersex infants is undertaken to make bodies conform to heterosexual norms: 

Holmes also problematizes this link, and in particular concepts of intersex as a third sex. In Locating Third Sexes (2004), Holmes argues that: 

Holmes also links the medical treatment of intersex bodies to the medical treatment of disabled bodies. In Rethinking the Meaning and Management of Intersexuality (2002), she argues that the surgical normalization of intersex infants is neither enhancement nor treatment. In Distracted Attentions: Intersexuality and Human Rights Protections (2005), she discusses the conceptualization of an intersex birth as an emergency, negating requirement for informed consent. In Mind the Gaps: Intersex and (Re-productive) Spaces in Disability Studies and Bioethics (June 2008) she argues that, while clinicians presume that "intersex characteristics are inherently disabling to social viability", recognition of the personhood of the intersex child necessitates refraining from "aggressive interference". The research notes trends to selectively terminate intersex fetuses.

In her book Intersex: A Perilous Difference (2008) Holmes argues that there is a duty to understand the stakes involved in conflating what is supposedly 'natural' with what is statistically 'normal', and of what is 'normal' with what is 'healthy'." Holmes reviews medical literature and popular culture to examine how society constructs monstrosity. She "singles out" the novel Middlesex by Jeffrey Eugenides, "and episodes of The X-Files for constructing intersex characters whose lives essentially reproduce the social fascination with the monstrous and the deviant." In The Intersex Enchiridion: Naming and Knowledge in the Clinic (2011), Holmes argues that the replacement of the word "intersex" with "disorders of sex development" in clinical settings "reinstitutionalises clinical power to delineate and silence those marked by the diagnosis" and "that this silencing is precisely the point of the new terminology."

In 2009, Holmes edited Critical Intersex, a collection of essays on intersex issues, including theoretical and empirical research. The book has been described as "an important book" (Anne Fausto-Sterling), "the 'go to source' for a contemporary, international representation of intersex studies," making "contributions that are precise, plainly written and very illuminating... the detail is fascinating and somewhat unnerving... beautifully clear and compassionate" (Contemporary Sociology), and "an important collection" (Suzanne Kessler, State University of New York).

Holmes has also written on her experience as an activist, including during her membership in the Intersex Society of North America. The essay When Max Beck and Morgan Holmes went to Boston'', provides an account of the participation by Holmes in the first public demonstration by intersex people, on October 26, 1996, an event that took place following the activists' exclusion from a clinical conference. The demonstration is now marked by Intersex Awareness Day

Selected bibliography

Books

Journals and articles

See also 
 Intersex human rights
 Intersex medical interventions

References 

Living people
Intersex women
Intersex rights activists
Gender studies academics
Canadian women sociologists
Canadian sociologists
Medical sociologists
Year of birth missing (living people)
Place of birth missing (living people)
Intersex and medicine
Intersex rights in Canada
Intersex academics
Intersex writers